Smrečno is a dispersed settlement in the Pohorje Hills in the Municipality of Slovenska Bistrica in northeastern Slovenia. Traditionally the entire area was part of the Styria region. It is now included with the rest of the municipality in the Drava Statistical Region.

References

External links
Smrečno at Geopedia

Populated places in the Municipality of Slovenska Bistrica